is a Japanese voice actress from Takarazuka, Hyōgo. Her major voice roles include Solty Revant in SoltyRei, Perry in Amuri in Star Ocean, Melancholy in Phi Brain: Puzzle of God, Choko in Chocotto Sister, and Nazuna Takanashi in Working!!.

Biography

Filmography

Anime

Anime films

Drama CD

Video games

References

External links
  
  (archive) 
 
 

1982 births
Living people
People from Takarazuka, Hyōgo
Japanese video game actresses
Japanese voice actresses